Rollinsville is a census-designated place (CDP) and post office in and governed by Gilpin County, Colorado, United States. The CDP is a part of the Denver–Aurora–Lakewood, CO Metropolitan Statistical Area. The Rollinsville post office has the ZIP Code 80474 (post office boxes). At the United States Census 2010, the population of the Rollinsville CDP was 181.

History
The Rollinsville Post Office has been in operation since 1871. The community was named for John Q. A. Rollins, a prominent mining executive in Gilpin County in the 1860s and 1870s.

Geography
Rollinsville is located in the mountains southwest of the city of Boulder, on the flank of a hill above South Boulder Creek along State Highway 119 between Nederland and Black Hawk. It consists of a small cluster of residences and several businesses at the terminus of the road leading westward up to Rollins Pass at the summit of the Front Range.  

The South Boulder Creek flows just south of the town. The creek follows the railroad tracks into a small canyon and emerges near the Boulder/Gilpin county border before flowing through Pinecliffe.

Demographics

See also

 List of census-designated places in Colorado
 Peak to Peak Highway
 Roosevelt National Forest

References

External links

 Rollinsville @ UncoverColorado.com
 Denver, Northwestern & Pacific Railway @ ColoradoEncyclopedia.org
 Moffat Tunnel @ UncoverColorado.com
 East Portal Camp Cabins @ Colorado Preservation
 Rollinsville @ WesternMiningHistory.com
 Rollinsville, Colorado Mining Claims And Mines
 Gilpin County website

Census-designated places in Gilpin County, Colorado
Census-designated places in Colorado
Denver metropolitan area